Mineur is a lunar impact crater that lies just to the northeast of the prominent crater Jackson on the far side of the Moon. Jackson lies at the center of a broad ray system, a portion of which covers Mineur. The closest other crater of note is Cockcroft to the north.

This is a heavily eroded crater formation, with a worn rim that stands in contrast to the well-defined features of Jackson. The northern part of the rim in particular has been heavily damaged by multiple overlapping impacts. The interior floor of Mineur is relatively featureless.

Satellite craters
By convention these features are identified on lunar maps by placing the letter on the side of the crater midpoint that is closest to Mineur.

References

 
 
 
 
 
 
 
 
 
 
 
 

Impact craters on the Moon